The Sea of Tragic Beasts is the fifth studio album by American deathcore band Fit for an Autopsy. The album was released October 25, 2019 through Nuclear Blast and was produced by the band's guitarist Will Putney.

Track listing

Personnel 
Credits adapted from album's liner notes.

Fit for an Autopsy
 Joe Badolato – lead vocals
 Pat Sheridan – guitars, backing vocals
 Will Putney – guitars, production, engineering, mixing, mastering
 Tim Howley – guitars
 Peter "Blue" Spinazola – bass
 Josean Orta – drums

Additional personnel
 Steve Seid – engineering
 Matt Guglielmo – editing
 Geo Hewitt – assistant
 Adam Burke – artwork

References

External links 
 

2019 albums
Fit for an Autopsy albums